Martinsville Township is one of fifteen townships in Clark County, Illinois, USA.  As of the 2010 census, its population was 1,602 and it contained 777 housing units.

Geography

Cities, towns, villages
 Martinsville

Unincorporated towns
 Weir
(This list is based on USGS data and may include former settlements.)

Cemeteries
The township contains these six cemeteries:  Island Grove, Kettering, Lincoln, Mount Pleasant, Baird and Rupp.

Major highways
  Interstate 70
  U.S. Route 40

Demographics

School districts
 Casey-Westfield Community Unit School District 4C
 Martinsville Community Unit School District 3C

Political districts
 Illinois' 15th congressional district
 State House District 109
 State Senate District 55

References
 
 United States Census Bureau 2007 TIGER/Line Shapefiles
 United States National Atlas

External links
 City-Data.com
 Illinois State Archives

Townships in Clark County, Illinois
Townships in Illinois